Janis Joplin's Greatest Hits is a 1973 collection of hit songs by American singer-songwriter Janis Joplin, who died in 1970. 
It features live versions of Down On Me and Ball and Chain which were included on the In Concert album the previous year.

The cover photo was taken in 1970 at Summerfair in Eden Park, Cincinnati OH.

Track listing
 "Piece of My Heart" (Bert Berns, Jerry Ragovoy) from Cheap Thrills– 4:14
 "Summertime" (George Gershwin, Ira Gershwin, Dubose Heyward) from Cheap Thrills– 4:02
 "Try (Just a Little Bit Harder)" (Ragovoy, Chip Taylor) from I Got Dem Ol' Kozmic Blues Again Mama!– 3:57
 "Cry Baby" (Berns, Ragovoy) from Pearl– 4:00
 "Me and Bobby McGee" (Fred Foster, Kris Kristofferson) from Pearl– 4:31
 "Down on Me" (Janis Joplin) from In Concert– 3:09
 "Get It While You Can" (Ragovoy, Mort Shuman) from Pearl– 3:27
 "Bye, Bye Baby" (Powell St. John) from Big Brother & the Holding Company– 2:37
 "Move Over" (Joplin) from Pearl– 3:44
 "Ball and Chain" (Big Mama Thornton) from In Concert– 7:59

Bonus tracks on 1999 remastered reissue
 "Maybe" (Richard Barrett) from I Got Dem Ol' Kozmic Blues Again Mama!– 3:39
 "Mercedes Benz" (Janis Joplin, Michael McClure, Bob Neuwirth) from Pearl– 1:45

Sales and certifications

References

1973 greatest hits albums
Janis Joplin compilation albums
Compilation albums published posthumously
Columbia Records compilation albums